Vecinos (English title: Neighbors) is a 2008 Colombian  produced telenovela and broadcast by Caracol Televisión. Vecinos made its debut on September 1, 2008. The telenovela has finished its run on Telefutura on May 3, 2010, in the United States. Re-broadcasts of the show were being shown on U.S. broadcaster Unimas (which was previously called Telefutura). It is commonly shown in Spanish classes to help the students learn better Spanish.

Synopsis 

In this Colombian telenovela, a humble man named Oscar (Robinson Díaz) is deeply in love with his neighbor Tatiana (Flora Martínez), despite the fact that they are of different social classes. This gives the name of the novela (Vecinos-Neighbors). During the novela, however, an ambitious woman named Jessica (Sara Corrales) is trying to marry Oscar because of his money when he won the lottery. She acts nice to him, since she is Oscar's girlfriend, but would not be so nice if Oscar didn't have money. Oscar finds people who don't like him during the way, like Jessica's boss and lover Rodolfo (Luis Mesa) and many of his neighbors. His mother (Maria Margarita Giraldo) and friends, however, help him along the way nonetheless. In the end, all the barriers are cleared, and Oscar and Tatiana live happily ever after.

Cast
Robinson Díaz as Óscar Leal
Flora Martínez as Tatiana Gómez
Luis Mesa as Rodolfo
Sara Corrales as Jessica
Maria Margarita Giraldo as Ruca
Fernando Solorzano as Henry
Kenny Delgado as Álvaro
Adriana Campos as Nicole
Patricia Polanco as Clara
Christian Tappan as Alfonso
Alexandra Restrepo as Patricia
Alberto Saavedra as Gervasio
Isabella Córdoba as Tata
Juan Carlos Arango as Rey Mauricio
Alberto Barrero as Ubaldo
Javier Gardeazábal as Alvarito
Pedro Palacio as Fercho
Diana Mendoza as Ligia
María Cristina Montoya as Blanca
Gabriel Vanegas as Pedro
Alberto León Jaramillo as Frank Pacheco
Diana Wiswell as Lina
Amparo Conde as Alicia
Andrés Felipe Torrez as Eduardo Pérez
Fernando Arango as Alberto Buendía
Víctor Hugo Trespalacios as El Cuervo
Carlos Kajú as Carlos Alfredo
Yesenia Valencia as Marisol Gómez

Ratings
On its first episode Vecinos brought a 15.2% rating (49.7 share), which made it the most watched premiere of 2008. On March 26, 2009, Vecinos got a 16.3% rating (50.1 share) making it the most-watched TV Show of the year so far.

External links
  Official site at Caracol TV
 

2008 telenovelas
2008 Colombian television series debuts
2009 Colombian television series endings
Colombian telenovelas
Caracol Televisión telenovelas
Spanish-language telenovelas
Television shows set in Bogotá